Michael Winterbottom,  (born 22 September 1934) is an English classical scholar and author, who was Corpus Christi Professor of Latin at the University of Oxford from 1992 to 2001.

Biography 
Michael Winterbottom was educated at Dulwich College, London, and Pembroke College, Oxford. During the Second World War, his family moved from Sale to Torquay, then to Walsall before settling in London.

After National Service in the Royal Signals between 1956 and 1958, he did graduate work at Merton College and then Christ Church, Oxford.  After five years as Lecturer in Latin and Greek at University College London (1962–67), he returned to Oxford as Fellow and Tutor in Classics at Worcester College. He moved to Corpus Christi College in 1992 as Corpus Christi Professor of Latin, retiring in 2001.

He has worked mainly on Latin prose texts dating from the Roman Republic to the High Middle Ages.

He was elected a Fellow of the British Academy in 1978.

Bibliography 
Complete bibliography is available in Michael Winterbottom, Style and Scholarship: Latin Prose from Gildas to Raffaele Regio (ed. Roberto Gamberini, Firenze, 2020), pp. xxiii–xlvii; see also Michael Winterbottom, Papers on Quintilian and Ancient Declamation (ed. Antonio Stramaglia, Oxford, 2019), pp. xiii–xx.

Notes and references

External links 
  
 Publications of Michael Winterbottom in the OPAC of the Regesta Imperii, Mainz 

Living people
1934 births
English classical scholars
Alumni of Pembroke College, Oxford
Fellows of Worcester College, Oxford
Fellows of Corpus Christi College, Oxford
People educated at Dulwich College
Corpus Christi Professors of Latin
Fellows of the British Academy
Alumni of Merton College, Oxford